Maximiliano Nahuel Salas (born 1 December 1997) is an Argentine professional footballer who plays for Chilean Primera División club Palestino as a forward.

Career
After ending his contract with Necaxa, he joined Chilean club Palestino on second half 2022.

References

External links
 
 

Living people
1997 births
People from Curuzú Cuatiá
Sportspeople from Corrientes Province
Association football forwards
Argentine footballers
Argentine expatriate footballers
All Boys footballers
O'Higgins F.C. footballers
Club Necaxa footballers
Club Deportivo Palestino footballers
Primera Nacional players
Chilean Primera División players
Liga MX players
Expatriate footballers in Chile
Argentine expatriate sportspeople in Chile
Expatriate footballers in Mexico
Argentine expatriate sportspeople in Mexico